David Worth (born March 2, 1940) is an American cinematographer and film director. He contributed as cinematographer to more than twenty films, including Bloodsport, Any Which Way You Can and Bronco Billy. He also directed films including Warrior of the Lost World, Lady Dragon and Hard Knocks while also doing a few films with pseudonyms such as Sven Conrad and Jim Hastings.  He directed the 1989 film Kickboxer.

Filmography
 Poor Pretty Eddie (1975)
 How Sweet It Is! (1978) (as Sven Conrad)
 Frat House (1979) (as Sven Conrad)
 Hard Knocks (1979)
 Pink Champagne (1979) (as Sven Conrad)
 Body Magic (1982) (as Sven Conrad)
 Doing It! (1982) (as Sven Conrad)
 Warrior of the Lost World (1983)
 Soldier's Revenge (1986)
 Kickboxer (1989)
 Lady Dragon (1992)
 Lady Dragon 2 (1993)
 Chain of Command (1994) (TV / Direct-to-video)
 American Tigers (1996)
 I Might Even Love You (1998)
 The Prophet's Game (2000)
 Fists of Rage (2006)
 Honor (2006)
 Hazard Jack (2014)
 House at the End of the Drive (2014)

References

External links 

1943 births
Living people
American film directors
American cinematographers